Carbonara al Ticino is a comune (municipality) in the Province of Pavia in the Italian region Lombardy, located about 35 km south of Milan and about 7 km southwest of Pavia.

It is part of the eastern Lomellina, near the left bank of the Ticino River.

References

Cities and towns in Lombardy